Rosary Robert Iwole (born April 21, 1995) known by her stage name Rosa Ree, is a Tanzanian rapper and singer.

Early life and education
Rosa Ree was born in Moshi, Tanzania. She was raised in Arusha and spend a bit of her childhood in Kenya. She completed her basic education in Narobi, Kenya, at Ainsworth Primary School and Rudolf Steiner Primary. She went on to complete her secondary education at Bishop Mazzoldi.

Career
Rosa Rose launched her music career in 2015, and was signed by Nahreel's Label (The Industry Studios). She released her debut single "One Time" in 2016.
In 2020, she was featured in the BET 2020 Hip Pop Cypher together with Kwesi Arthur from Ghana and Elizabeth Ventura from Angola.

Discography

Singles
Its Your Birthday (2021)
Wote ft Snake Fire, Barkeliam, DIZ Afrikana & Ray Medya (2021)
Satan (2021)
That Gal (2020)
Usiyempenda Kaja (2020)
Kanyor' Aleng (2020)
Kupoa (2020)
Nazichanga ft Roberto (2020)
Balenciaga (2020)
Sukuma Ndinga (2020)
Sukuma Ndinga Remix ft Rayvanny (2020)
Asante Baba (2019)
Alamba Chini ft Spice Diana, Gigi Lamayne & Ghetto Kids (2019)
Acha Ungese ft Fik Fameica (2019)
What You Know (2020)
Nguvu Za Kiume (2019)
Champion ft Ruby (2019)
Asante Baba Remix ft Timmy Tdat (2019)
Dip n' Whine it ft Gnako (2019)
Banjuka (2018)
One Way (2018)
Way Up ft Emtee (2018) <
Marathon ft Billnas (2018)
Dow (2019) 
Champion ft Ruby (2020)
Up in the Air (2017)
One Time (2017)
One Time Remix ft Khaligraph Jones (2017)

References

External links
 
 Rosa Ree on YouTube

1995 births
Living people
Tanzanian women rappers
21st-century Tanzanian women singers
 Tanzanian Bongo Flava musicians
 Tanzanian hip hop musicians
 Swahili-language singers